Lincoln, Nebraska hosts various cultural events throughout the year. This list is broken into seasons on a calendar year.

Mid to late winter

Mid February: Abraham Lincoln Birthday Celebration
Late February or early March: Nebraska State High School Swimming & Diving Championships; Lincoln Polar Plunge
March: Nebraska State High School Basketball Championships

Spring

April: Lincoln Earth Day
Mid April: ConStellation Science Fiction Convention
First Saturday in May: Mayor's Run
First Sunday in May: Lincoln National Guard Marathon and Half-Marathon
Third Saturday in May: James Arthur Vineyards Renaissance Festival
May 13 to July 17: Horse racing at Lincoln Race Course
Mid May: Wake Up the Beds
Mid May through Fall:  Party in the Parks
Early May to late October: The Haymarket Farmers' Market in the Historic Haymarket

Summer

Early June: Cornhusker Boys' and Girls' State; Havelock Charity Run; Celebrate Lincoln
Mid June: Formula SAE Lincoln
Tuesday evenings in June: Jazz in June
Third Friday in June, July and August: Dock Stock
Late June: International Thespian Festival; Trail Trek
July 3: Uncle Sam Jam
Second half of July: Cornhusker State Games (multi-location event)
Early August: Lancaster County Fair
Second weekend in August: Capital City Ribfest
Late August: Lincoln ZombieFest; Nebraska Mud Run
Late August to late November: University of Nebraska Cornhusker Football

Fall/autumn

Early September: Sports Car Club of America Solo National Championship Autocross
Mid September: Streets Alive!
Late September/Early October:  Lincoln Calling
Second Saturday in October: Pumpkin Run; Market to Market Relay Nebraska
Late October: Boo at the Zoo
November: Nebraska State High School Football Championships; Nebraska State High School Volleyball Championships
Early November: The Good Life Halfsy
First Saturday in November: Put the Beds to Bed
Mid November:  Shop the Blocks
November 11: Veterans Day Walk of Recognition, program at Auld Recreation Center

Early winter

Second Sunday in December: Nebraska State Christmas Tree Lighting Ceremony and Carol Sing

Notes

References

Nebraska culture
Nebraska-related lists
Lincoln, Nebraska